The Queensland Railways B11 class locomotive was a class of 2-6-0 steam locomotives operated by the Queensland Railways.

History
In 1880, the Queensland Railways took delivery of two 2-6-0 locomotives built by Baldwin Locomotive Works. Per Queensland Railway's classification system they were designated the B12 class, B representing they had three driving axles, and the 11 the cylinder diameter in inches.

Class list

References

Baldwin locomotives
Railway locomotives introduced in 1880
B11
2-6-0 locomotives
3 ft 6 in gauge locomotives of Australia